Quiatoni Zapotec (San Pedro Quiatoni Zapotec, Eastern Tlacolula Zapotec) is a Zapotec language of Oaxaca, Mexico.

References

Zapotec languages